"Crash and Burn" is a song by Australian pop group Savage Garden from their second album, Affirmation, released as the album's fourth single (third in the UK) on 20 March 2000. It reached the top 20 in Australia, Canada, New Zealand, and the United Kingdom, as well as number 24 on the US Billboard Hot 100, becoming their last hit on the chart.

Background
The song's lyrics describe the difficult search for solace and meaningful relationships in a cold world, peaking in a chorus that argues it is fine to "crash and burn" during tough times in order to get over heartache and pain. In a June 2017 interview, singer Darren Hayes described it as one of his favourite Savage Garden songs: "Musically it’s a dear song to me, because it’s all the words I wished someone would have said to me during the period after the first Savage Garden album."

Music video
The video is shot in a partially fantastical theme, featuring scenes of troubled young adults interspersed with scenes of the group singing in a warehouse. Messages such as "stay connected" and lyrics from the song, such as "fall apart" appear on the screen. At the end of the video, Hayes uses Auslan to sing the last lyrics of the song.

Track listings and formats

 Australian CD single
 "Crash and Burn"  – 4:41
 "I Knew I Loved You" (12-inch Mini Me mix) – 8:25
 "I Knew I Loved You" (club mix) – 6:03

 European CD single
 "Crash and Burn" (radio edit) – 3:50
 "I Don't Care" (vocal and drum mix) – 4:10

 European maxi-CD single
 "Crash and Burn"  – 4:41
 "I Knew I Loved You" (Eddie's Savage Dance mix) – 5:58
 "Gunning Down Romance" (Drum and Bass mix) – 6:05
 "I Knew I Loved You" (Eddie's Rhythm radio mix) – 4:24

 UK CD1
 "Crash and Burn"  – 4:41
 "I Don't Care" (vocal and drum mix) – 4:10
 "Crash and Burn" (instrumental) – 4:42

 UK CD2
 "Crash and Burn" (radio edit) – 3:50
 "Two Beds and a Coffee Machine" (vocal and drum mix) – 3:26
 "Gunning Down Romance" (drum and bass mix) – 6:05

 UK cassette single
 "Crash and Burn" (radio edit) – 3:50
 "Two Beds and a Coffee Machine"  – 3:26

Credits and personnel
Credits and personnel are adapted from the Affirmation album liner notes.
 Darren Hayes – writer, co-producer, lead vocals, background vocals
 Daniel Jones – writer, co-producer, keyboards, synthesizers, drum and rhythm programming, electric guitars
 Walter Afanasieff – producer, keyboards, synthesizers, drum and rhythm programming
 Greg Bieck – Macintosh and digital programming
 Michael Thompson – electric guitars
 Dean Parks – acoustic guitars
 Nathan East – bass
 Dave Way – mixing at Wallyworld Studios (Marin County)
 Dave Frazer – vocals engineering at Wallyworld Studios, guitars engineering at Wallyworld Studios and Andora Studios (Hollywood)
 Kent Matcke – track engineering
 Luis Quine – assistant engineer
 Tony Rambo – assistant engineer
 Pete Krawiec – assistant engineer
 Mark Gregory – assistant engineer

Charts

Weekly charts

Year-end charts

Certifications and sales

Release history

References

1999 songs
2000 singles
APRA Award winners
Savage Garden songs
Song recordings produced by Walter Afanasieff
Songs written by Daniel Jones (musician)
Songs written by Darren Hayes